Redemption Hospital is a hospital operated by the government in Liberia capital city Monrovia. It holds 200 beds. This hospital had stopped its operations during the hard times of the Ebola epidemic and civil wars.

See also 
 List of hospitals in Liberia
 2014 Ebola virus epidemic in Liberia

References

Hospitals in Monrovia